Wuthering Heights is a 1920 British silent drama film directed by A. V. Bramble and starring Milton Rosmer, Colette Brettel and Warwick Ward. It is the first film adaptation made of the 1847 novel Wuthering Heights by Emily Brontë, and was primarily filmed in and around her home village of Haworth. It is not known whether the film currently survives, and it is considered to be a lost film.

Plot summary

Cast
 Milton Rosmer - Heathcliff
 Ann Trevor - Cathy
 Colette Brettel - Catherine
 Warwick Ward - Hindley Earnshaw
 John Lawrence Anderson - Edgar Linton
 Cecil Morton York - Mr Earnshaw
 Cyril Raymond - Hareton Earnshaw
 Dora De Winton - Mrs Linton
 Aileen Bagot - Frances Earnshaw
 Mrs. Templeton - Nelly Dean
 George Traill - Joseph
 Alfred Bennett - Reverend Shields
 Edward Thirlby - Attorney
 G. Mallalieu - Doctor
 Derrick Ronald - Heathcliff (age 5)
 Albert Brantford - Heathcliff (age 12)
 Florence Kenyon (as Twinkles Hunter) - Cathy (age 6)
 Audrey Smith - Catherine (age 7)
 Roy Lennol - Hindley Earnshaw (age 14)
 Lewis Barry-Furniss - Edgar Linton (age 15)
 Lewis Barber - Hareton Earnshaw (age 15)

See also
 List of lost films

References

External links
 
 
 

1920 films
1920s historical drama films
British historical drama films
1920s English-language films
Films directed by A. V. Bramble
Films based on Wuthering Heights
Ideal Film Company films
Films set in Yorkshire
British silent feature films
British black-and-white films
1920 drama films
Lost British films
1920s British films
Silent drama films